Louis Kossuth Atwood, also documented as L. K. Attwood (December 15, 1850 - January 8, 1929)  was a lawyer, bank founder and president, minister, teacher and state legislator in Mississippi.

Early life and education 

He was born December 15, 1850 in Alabama to slave parents. He was sold at a slave auction when he was 18 months old, his mother bought him and took him away to Ohio.

Altwood obtained both his primary and secondary education at Ripley, Ohio. He was an 1874 Bachelor of Arts graduate of Lincoln University in Pennsylvania. Altwood was also ordained as a Presbyterian minister while at university.

He helped found Southern Bank in Jackson and served as its president.

Career 
After graduating he moved to Bolton, Mississippi where he started working as a school teacher and then later in commerce.

He studied law and was admitted to The Mississippi Bar in 1879 before starting up a law practice in Bolton.

He founded the fraternal insurance company the Sons and Daughters of Jacob of America in 1883 which he ran until his death.

Altwood served two terms in the Mississippi House of Representatives from: 1880 to 1881 and from 1884 to 1885 representing Hinds County as a Republican.

He was also appointed a United States internal revenue collector, until 1899, and was a delegate to several republican national conventions.

Death 
He died January 8, 1929 (as reported by his grave) or January 7 as reported in the newspaper obituary that described him as "one of Mississippi's greatest negro citizens".
He was survived by his widow of 49 years Maggie Beatrice Welborne, one son, Dr. Mollison Atwood and three daughters Hcrtycena Dickson, Ollive McKissack and Mary Millsaps.

See also
 African-American officeholders during and following the Reconstruction era

References

External links

American Presbyterian ministers
People from Ripley, Ohio
People from Bolton, Mississippi
Lincoln University (Pennsylvania) alumni
Members of the Mississippi House of Representatives
19th-century Presbyterian ministers
Mississippi lawyers
1850 births
1929 deaths
Schoolteachers from Mississippi
African-American schoolteachers
19th-century American educators
American freedmen